Alfredo Goyeneche Moreno (15 December 1937 – 16 March 2002) was a Spanish equestrian. He competed in the team jumping event at the 1960 Summer Olympics.

References

External links
 

1937 births
2002 deaths
Spanish male equestrians
Olympic equestrians of Spain
Equestrians at the 1960 Summer Olympics
Sportspeople from San Sebastián